Vedavyasa Tirtha was a Hindu philosopher, scholar and saint. He served as the pontiff of Shri Uttaradi Math from 1595-1619. He was the 15th in succession from Madhvacharya. Vedavyasa Tirtha ruled the pontificate with a remarkable distinction.and entered into vrindavana at banks of river markandeya

References

Bibliography
 

Madhva religious leaders
Vaishnavism
Uttaradi Math
Dvaitin philosophers
Bhakti movement
Hindu activists
Dvaita Vedanta